Robert Bristow (1712 – 9 December 1776) of Micheldever in Hampshire was an English politician.

His father Robert (1687–1737) and his grandfather Robert (1662–1706), as well as his uncle John had all been Members of Parliament.

Bristow was a Member of Parliament (MP) for Winchelsea from 1738 to 1741, and for New Shoreham from 1747 to 1761. He was appointed a Clerk of the Green Cloth from 1738 to 1740.

He married twice and had a son and 4 daughters.

References

1712 births
1776 deaths
People from the City of Winchester
Members of the Parliament of Great Britain for English constituencies
British MPs 1734–1741
British MPs 1741–1747
British MPs 1747–1754
British MPs 1754–1761
British MPs 1761–1768